The 2000 All-Ireland Intermediate Hurling Championship was the 17th staging of the All-Ireland hurling championship. The championship ended on 23 September 2000.

Galway were the defending champions, however, they were defeated by Tipperary in the final who won the title by 2-17 to 1-10.

References

Intermediate
All-Ireland Intermediate Hurling Championship